The 2014–15 season was Brøndby's 34th consecutive season in the top flight of Danish football, 25th consecutive season in the Danish Superliga, and 49th year in existence as a football club. Brøndby participated in the Europa League this season, after coming in 4th place in the 2013–14 Danish Superliga.

Squad 
As 2 September 2014.

Out on loan

Competitions

Overview

Overall

Danish Superliga

League table

Results summary

Results by round

Matches

July

August

September

October

November

December

February

March

Danish Cup

UEFA Europa League

Third qualifying round

Statistics

Goalscorers 

This includes all competitive matches. The list is sorted by shirt number when total goals are equal.

Note: ^ indicate player left out club during season.

Clean sheets 

This includes all competitive matches. The list is sorted by shirt number when total clean sheets are equal.

References 

2014-15
Danish football clubs 2014–15 season
2014–15 UEFA Europa League participants seasons